Paula Fredriksen (born January 6, 1951, Kingston, Rhode Island) is an American historian and scholar of early Christianity. She held the position of William Goodwin Aurelio Professor of Scripture at Boston University from 1990 to 2010. Now emerita, she has been distinguished visiting professor in the Department of Comparative Religion at the Hebrew University of Jerusalem, since 2009.

Fredriksen specializes in the history of Christianity in that developmental arc from its stirrings in an apocalyptic messianic sect within Second Temple Judaism to its transformation into an arm of Late Roman imperial government and its empowerment in the post-Roman West (1st through 7th centuries). She works to reconstruct the many ways that various ancient Mediterranean peoples – pagans, Jews and Christians – interacted with the many special social agents (e.g. high gods, apocalyptic forces, heavenly bodies, godlings, spirits, and divine humans) that populated both the ancient flat-disced Earth and geo-centric universe.

Fredriksen served as an historical consultant and featured speaker in many media, including for the BBC production The Lives of Jesus (1996) and for U.S. News & World Reports "The Life and Times of Jesus". Fredriksen's book From Jesus to Christ: The Origins of the Early Images of Jesus served as a template for the Frontline documentary From Jesus to Christ: The First Christians.

Fredriksen was elected to the American Academy of Arts and Sciences in 2013.

Education
Fredriksen studied for a double B.A. in Religion and History at Wellesley College, from which she graduated Phi Beta Kappa in 1973. After a year of formal theological study at St. Hilda's College, she received a diploma in theology from Oxford University in 1974.

Fredriksen earned her Ph.D. in the History of Religion from Princeton University in 1979. From 1979 to 1980, she was an Andrew W. Mellon Postdoctoral Fellow in the Religion Department at Stanford University. Both Wellesley College (in 1989) and Princeton University (in 2000) deemed Fredriksen a “distinguished alumna.”

Career
Fredriksen began her career as a lecturer at the Department of Religion of Princeton University in 1978. From 1979 to 1980, she was a faculty member at the department of religious studies at Stanford University. She relocated to the University of California, Berkeley where, from 1980 to 1986, she was an assistant professor in the department of history and, from 1986 to 1989, worked as an associate professor in the department of religious studies of the University of Pittsburgh.  From 1990 to 2010, Fredriksen was the William Goodwin Aurelio Professor of Scripture at Boston University.

Fredriksen was named distinguished visiting professor in the Department of Comparative Religion at Hebrew University of Jerusalem in 2009. In April 2013, she was elected a fellow of the American Academy of Arts & Sciences (AAAS).

She holds honorary doctorates from Iona College (2008), Lund University in Sweden (2017), and the Hebrew University of Jerusalem (2018).

Scholarship

Jesus
Fredriksen views ancient Christianity from two vantage points: that of late Second Temple Judaism (roughly 200 BCE to 70 CE) and that of the late Latin West (especially from the late fourth to the mid-fifth century CE). For the entire spread of these centuries, Fredriksen says, the vast majority of people worshiped their own particular gods—a great variety of cults and customs lumped together by scholarly convention as "paganism." Fredriksen emphasizes that different forms of Judaism developed within the larger matrix of Graeco-Roman paganism; and that different forms of Christianity developed within different types of Judaism and of paganism. Context affects content: all these cultures mutually influenced each other.

Late Second Temple Judaism, whether in the Jewish homeland or in the Diaspora, provided the cradle of the early Christ-movements. Two figures dominate their development and thus Fredriksen's research of the period: that of Jesus of Nazareth, and that of his apostle, Paul. Despite the many cultural and social differences distinguishing Jesus and Paul—language (Aramaic/Greek), location (Jewish territories and Jerusalem/Diaspora) and audiences (Jews/pagans)—these two men stood united in a single conviction. Both taught that the God of Israel would overwhelm evil, raise the dead, and establish his reign of eternal peace and justice, within their own lifetimes. In short, in line with the work of Albert Schweitzer (for Jesus and for Paul) and of Krister Stendahl (for Paul), Fredriksen holds that both Jesus and Paul were apocalyptic thinkers.

In From Jesus to Christ, Fredriksen explored the images of Jesus presented in Paul's letters and in the four gospels as these altered and adjusted once the movement spread abroad in the Diaspora and outgrew its own foundational prophecy: “The Kingdom of God is at hand!” (Mark 1.15). In Jesus of Nazareth, King of the Jews, she concentrated instead on reconstructing the historical figure himself. Turning to the chronology of John's gospel (wherein Jesus has a three-year mission, centered in Jerusalem) rather than that of Mark, Matthew and Luke (which locate Jesus primarily in Galilee, with a single, and fatal, trip to Jerusalem), Fredriksen answered the question why Jesus was crucified but his followers were not. Pilate and the chief priests were familiar with Jesus' apocalyptic message—God, not human armies, would establish his Kingdom—and so knew that Jesus was, in every practical way, politically and militarily harmless.

But on what proved to be his final trip to the city for Passover, crowds in the pilgrim-swollen city began proclaiming Jesus as messiah. This was cause for alarm for, as Josephus wrote, it was "on these festive occasions that sedition is most apt to break out." Working in concert with the temple police (John 18.3), Pilate arrested Jesus and crucified him as "King of the Jews," disabusing the crowds of their enthusiasm. It was the crowds, not Jesus himself, Fredriksen concludes, who threatened the city's stability. This theory explains as well why the original community could resettle permanently in Jerusalem, largely without incident, for the remaining four decades of the city's lifetime.

Paul
Fredriksen's many articles on Paul and his cameo appearances in her books on Jesus and on Augustine come together in her book Paul: The Pagans' Apostle. Fredriksen explains there that Paul lived in a world full of gods. As Christ's apostle, Paul taught that pagans did not have to become Jews (for men, meaning circumcision). But they did have to commit to worshiping Israel's god alone, he insisted, and to live according to some—not all—Jewish law.

Following especially the broad lines of interpretation laid down by Albert Schweitzer and by Krister Stendahl, Fredriksen asserts that Paul believed that he lived and worked in history's final hour. Paul was convinced that he knew the time on God's clock because of his experience of the Risen Christ: resurrection itself, according to apocalyptic Jewish convictions, would signal the time of the End. In the brief meanwhile, between Christ's first and final advents, Paul worked to turn pagans from their gods to his god.

Paul's seven undisputed letters date to the 50s of the first century. They are the only evidence of the Christ movement that predates the Roman destruction of Jerusalem's temple (in 70 CE). But Jesus died around the year 30 CE. This passage of time after the death of Jesus, according to Fredriksen, means that, by the time that the earliest stratum of tradition appears—namely, in Paul's letters—the Kingdom of God was already late. In the Diaspora, the movement fractured into competing missions over the question of how to integrate ex-pagan gentiles into its communities. Some apostles taught that ex-pagan males needed to enter Israel's covenant with God through circumcision, that is, full conversion to Judaism. Paul furiously disagreed, Fredriksen emphasizes. Against his circumcising competitors, he argued that the presence of Christ's spirit or of holy spirit within these gentile communities attested to their "adoption" into God's family: Christ-following ex-pagans, insists Paul, are now Israel's brothers" (adelphoi), adopted via Christ into the family of Abraham.

Paul thought not that gentiles should not become Jews, but that they could not become Jews: covenantal circumcision, he insisted, occurs only on the eighth day of the male infant's life (Philippians 3.5). Jewish circumcision for adult gentile males, in view of Jewish law, was thus "nothing" (1 Corinthians 7.19). His letters, all addressed to gentile communities, argue vehemently against his circumcising competitors. By the late first- early second century, this generation long dead, Paul's intra-Jewish arguments will be interpreted by gentile readers as anti-Jewish arguments. In this way, Fredriksen shows, Paul's letters became a wellspring for nineteen centuries of Christian anti-Judaism and antisemitism.

Fredriksen thus contributes to a new school of New Testament scholarship, "Paul within Judaism." Believing that the Kingdom would arrive in his own lifetime, Paul had no intention of starting a new religion—much less an anti-Jewish religion. But Paul does acknowledge the existence "of many gods and many lords" (1 Corinthians 8.5: "lord" is a common designation for a Mediterranean god): they are Christ's cosmic opposition. Paul, thus, should be understood not only within Judaism, urges Fredriksen. As a late Second Temple Diaspora Jew, the apocalyptic Paul also stands "within paganism." It was these pagan superhuman powers, taught Paul, whom Christ will defeat when he returns in glory as God's Davidic champion.

Augustine 
Through Krister Stendahl's classic article, “Paul and the Introspective Conscience of the West,” Fredriksen first made the acquaintance of the mid-first century Paul and of Paul's greatest western interpreter, Augustine of Hippo. Augustine's Paul, in late Latin translation, was the source of Augustine's signature teachings on human will, divine grace, original sin, and predestination. As he struggled particularly with Paul's letter to the Romans, Augustine redefined "free will." Human moral agency, he now argued, was in a state of diminished capacity, which was the just penalty of Adam's sin, inherited across generations. In Augustine on Romans (1982), the first English translation of two of his early works on Paul's epistle, Fredriksen charted Augustine's evolving struggles with this nexus of issues. These commentaries on Romans were the prelude to Augustine's master work, the Confessions.

Fredriksen continued to consider and to contrast the first-century Jewish Paul and the late fourth-century Augustinian Paul together. She compared scholarly assessments of their respective "conversions." She analyzed both men's ideas on flesh and resurrection. She measured the distance between their respective ideas on the destiny of Israel. She traced Augustine's weaponization of Paul against Pelagius. She explored the similarities and differences between them on such issues as sin, salvation, and God. Fredriksen also brought Augustine into conversation with other ancient theologians: with Tyconius (on Christian millenarianism); with Origen (on Paul and Jewish Law; on sin and salvation); and with Isidore of Seville (on Jews).

Augustine surprised Fredriksen, however, once she began to investigate how the idea of "Jews" shaped his theology. By Augustine's lifetime (354-430 CE), Jews had long figured as the negative contrast to gentile Christianity. Indeed, Augustine himself deployed standard anti-Jewish rhetoric against his Christian rivals, the Donatists: Jews might be "bad," but the Donatists, he observed, were even worse. But against the anti-Judaism of his old heretical church, the Manichees, Augustine thought outside the box. He taught that Jesus, the original apostles, and Paul himself, even after Damascus, had all continued to live according to the Jewish interpretation of Jewish law. The Jews' continuing existence, he insisted, was of benefit to the church, because through them, the texts of the Bible had penetrated the known world. Most dramatically, Augustine urged that the Jews had no less a protector than God himself, who would punish any ruler, whether pagan or Christian, who tried to inhibit them from living Jewish lives. In advocating for an historical understanding of Christianity, in other words, Augustine framed, as well, a principled Christian theological defense of Jews and of Judaism. Dismally negative as his traditional anti-Jewish rhetoric was, his positive ideology, Fredriksen concludes, was original, daring, and unique. Augustine's singular teaching would survive the collapse of the western Roman Empire, ultimately saving Jewish lives in the course of medieval crusades.

Publications
In 1982, Fredriksen published Augustine on Romans, a Latin edition with facing translation of Augustine's two early efforts with Paul's epistle to the Romans. These two exercises in biblical interpretation prepared Augustine, within four years, to frame his signature masterpiece, the Confessions.

In 1988, Fredriksen published From Jesus to Christ, which traces the first-century growth of various images of Jesus. The book won the 1988 Yale University Press Governors’ Award for Best Book.

In 1999, Fredriksen published Jesus of Nazareth, King of the Jews on the historical Jesus. The book won a National Jewish Book Award. In 2000, Boston University named it a best faculty book.

In 2008, Fredriksen published Augustine and the Jews (second edition Yale 2010), which situates Augustine's teachings about Jews and Judaism within their contemporary context of Christian anti-Judaism and the imperial church's exercise of coercive force against religious minorities.

In 2012, Fredriksen published Sin: The Early History of an Idea, which explored how views about humanity and about God changed in the centuries between John the Baptist and Augustine of Hippo. The book was based on Fredriksen's 2007 Spencer Trask lectures at Princeton.

In 2017, Fredriksen published Paul: The Pagan's Apostle, which situates Paul within, not against, his native Judaism. In 2018, the book won the Prose Award for best book in religion from the American Publisher's Association.

In 2018, Fredriksen published When Christians Were Jews, in which she argued for the Jewish, apocalyptic convictions of the original Christ-community in Jerusalem, the founding generation – which was convinced that it was history's final generation.

Christian antisemitism in both its academic forms and in its popular ones led to two of Fredriksen's anthologies, Jesus, Judaism, and Christian Anti-Judaism: Reading the New Testament After the Holocaust (with Adele Reinhartz; 2002) and On ‘The Passion of the Christ’ (2004; 2005, on Mel Gibson's film), as well as to her appreciation of David Nirenberg's foundational work on the same theme.  Her 2020 Shaffer Lectures at Yale, "Paul's Letters, Christian Identity, and Thinking with Jews," explored the way that anti-Judaism, in various modalities, continues to inflect the work of contemporary scholars of New Testament Studies.

Together with Jesper Svartvik, she organized and edited Krister Among the Jews and Gentiles. Essays in Appreciation of the Life and Work of Krister Stendahl (2018), to whom she also dedicated her book on Paul.

References

External links 
Introduction to Fredriksen's book From Jesus to Christ.
Your Questions to Paula Fredriksen from Beliefnet.com.
Jesus, Paul and the Origins of Christianity, video of lecture at Princeton University
Paul, Pagans and the Redemption of Israel  video of lecture at University of Minnesota
When Does Christianity Begin?, video of lecture at the Israeli Academy of Sciences and Humanities
Are You a Virgin? Biblical Exegesis and the Invention of Tradition, video lecture at King's College London
When Jesus Celebrated Passover, op-ed in Wall Street Journal
Symposium on "Paul: The Pagan's Apostle" in Syndicate
Symposium on Synergistic Pneumata in Syndicate

1951 births
21st-century American historians
21st-century American women writers
Alumni of the University of Oxford
American historians of religion
American women historians
Boston University faculty
Converts to Judaism
Historians of antiquity
Historians of Christianity
Historians of Jews and Judaism
Jewish American historians
Living people
Princeton University alumni
Scholars of antisemitism
Stanford University alumni
University of California, Berkeley College of Letters and Science faculty
University of Pittsburgh faculty
Writers from Rhode Island
Historians from California
21st-century American Jews